Grupo Desportivo da Expresso, for sponsorship reasons also called Expresso Fagec F.C., is a multi-sports club in the city of Cazenga, Luanda Province, Angola. Its main sport is women's football, where it is one of the most successful teams in the country.

History
The Grupo Desportivo da Nocal (GD Nocal) team was founded in 1963 as a team of workers at the Nocal brewery, during the period of the Portuguese colonial administration. In 2008, the brewery separated from GD Nocal, when the team changed its name to Grupo Desportivo da Expresso.

For a short period of time it adopted the name "Gira Jovem de Cazenga", when again it was called Expresso Fagec again. For sponsorship reasons it is also known as "Fagec F.C."

Honours

Notable players
 Miguel Lutonda
 Filipe Abraão
 José Nascimento

Former managers
 Raúl Duarte

See also
Angola Women's League
Federação Angolana de Basquetebol

References

External links
Facebook profile

Sports clubs in Angola
Basketball teams in Angola
1963 establishments in Angola
Basketball teams established in 1963